The transport infrastructure of the Cayman Islands consists of a public road network, two seaports, and three airports.

Roads
As of 2000, the Cayman Islands had a total of 488 miles (785 km) of paved highway.

Driving is on the left, and speed is reckoned in miles per hour, as in the UK. The legal blood alcohol content is 100mg per 100ml (0.1%), the highest in the world.

Seaports
Two ports, Cayman Brac and George Town, serve the islands. One hundred and twenty-three ships (of 1,000 GT or more) are registered in the Cayman Islands, with a total capacity of 2,402,058 GT/. Some foreign ships (including vessels from Cyprus, Denmark, Greece, Norway, the UK, and US) are registered in the Cayman Islands under a flag of convenience.  (All figures are 2002 estimates.)

Airports

There are three airports on the Islands. The main airport Owen Roberts International Airport serving Grand Cayman, Charles Kirkconnell International Airport serving Cayman Brac and Edward Bodden Airfield serving Little Cayman.

Buses
A fleet of Share taxi minibuses serves Grand Cayman.

A daily service starts at 6.00 from the depot and runs as follows from George Town to:

West Bay — every 15 minutes: 6.00–23.00 (24.00 on Fr, Sa). CI$1.50 each way. 
Bodden Town — every 30 minutes: 6.00–23.00 (24.00 on Fr, Sa). CI$1.50 each way. 
East End and North Side — every hour, 6.00–21.00 (24.00 on Fr). CI$2 each way. 

Colour-coded logos on the front and rear of the buses (white mini-vans) identify the routes:

See also 
 Cayman Islands

References